Khaled Idris Bahray was an Eritrean refugee and asylum seeker in Germany, who was stabbed to death on January 12, 2015, in Dresden. Although it was widely speculated and claimed in the media and on social media that the murder had racist motives, some days later an Eritrean roommate of Bahray confessed to the murder.

Life
Khaled Idris Bahray was born in  Keren, Eritrea, and was a Muslim.  At the age of five, he fled with his mother and sister to Wadi Halfa in Sudan. As a refugee, he was able to receive neither an education nor employment. In 2014 he decided to flee with a cousin to Europe. They made their way over land to Libya and over the Mediterranean Sea via refugee boat. He arrived in Sicily, his cousin perished along the boat journey. In August 2014 he arrived in a refugee camp in Munich, from where he was brought to Chemnitz, then housed in Schneeberg and finally in Dresden. In September 2014, he was assigned to a Dresden apartment with other refugees, in the district of Leubnitz-Neuostra. His friends and flatmates described him as a peace-loving and kindly man.

Events 
On the night of January 12, 2015, Bahray left his apartment around 8 pm  to buy cigarettes in a supermarket 100 meters from his apartment. He did not return. The next morning at 7:40 am, his body was found, covered with blood, in the courtyard of his apartment complex. Police did not initially realize the extent of his injuries and reported “no indications of foul play” – though the death certificate registered a suspicion of unnatural death. The autopsy – still the morning of January 13 – revealed that Bahray had died due to multiple knife wounds in the neck and upper body. On January 14, Bahray’s seven flatmates, together with 16 others who had gathered at the flat when his body was found, were questioned by police and gave DNA samples.

The murder investigation officially commenced on January 15. Evidence was gathered in the victim's home and witnesses were interviewed.  On January 22, the prosecuting office stated that a 26-year-old Eritrean roommate of Bahray's had confessed the stabbing and had been taken under arrest.

Criticism of police
As the investigation was delayed for so long after finding the body, member of the Bundestag Volker Beck (Alliance '90/The Greens) filed criminal charges of obstruction of justice. The Dresden police chief was questioned by the Saxon Committee on Internal Affairs.

The conduct of the police work was referred to as a scandal by the media.

Public reactions

To immigration
 Three days prior to the murder of Bahray, two swastikas were smeared on his apartment door, accompanied by the words “We’ll get you all”. The eight refugees' official social worker had reported this, as well as someone kicking at the door, and filed charges. 
 The murder coincided with the weekly Pegida demonstrations that were taking place every Monday night.

To the crime
 There was speculation on social media  of racist motives to the murder.

 On the afternoon of January 14, a candlelight vigil was held at Dresden  Square with 200 asylum seekers and supporters. Vigil participants spontaneously demonstrated in a march to the Dresden Albertinum to speak with Saxon president Stanislaw Tillich about their fears. Tillich did not appear, but the minister of integration did briefly.
 The Eritrean Refugees of Dresden report no longer feeling safe in Dresden after the murder and want to move to a safer part of Germany.
 Elizabeth Chyrum, the Director of Human Rights Concern-Eritrea, sent an open letter to the German Federal Minister of Justice and Consumer Protection: "... It seems extraordinary that, according to news reports, the German police initially claimed they did not suspect foul play even though the body was covered in blood and wounds and this happened in the wake of the anti-immigrant and anti-Muslim demonstrations in Dresden, and given the persistent threats refugees in the area have been experiencing, there seems to be little doubt that Mr. Bahray is a victim of these extremists..."

References

External links
 Remembering Khaled – Commemoration and information site for Khaled Idris Bahray and refugee protest 

Dresden
2015 murders in Germany
January 2015 crimes in Europe
2010s in Saxony
Crime in Saxony